Rafalca is a dressage horse co-owned by Ann Romney that performed in the equestrian competition at the 2012 Summer Olympics, with rider (and co-owner/trainer) Jan Ebeling.

Biography
Rafalca is a bay mare with "a milk chocolate coat, raven tail and white socks above three of her hooves". She is an Oldenburg, a warmblood horse breed from the north-western corner of Lower Saxony. She was born in Menslage in Germany in 1997, and bred by Erwin Risch.

Rafalca's sire was Argentinus, a Hanoverian jumping stallion, and her dam Ratine was an Oldenburg. Her damsire was Rubinstein, also a dressage horse.

Career
Rafalca has competed with Ebeling at the Grand Prix level, the highest competition level in dressage, since 2007, and was a representative for the United States in the Dressage World Cup Finals in 2009, 2011, and 2012.

In June 2012, Ebeling and Rafalca won a spot on the U.S. Olympics dressage team. At the 2012 Summer Olympics in London, after participating over several days, Ebeling and Rafalca finished in 28th place with a score of 69.302 and did not qualify to move on to the final round for individual medals. They were part of a 6th place overall finish for the U.S. team. Romney said of her horse, "It was wonderful. She was elegant and consistent again. We just love her."

In popular culture
Rafalca is referred to in the show 30 Rock, Saturday Night Live, as well as The Newsroom and Tooning Out the News.

References

Dressage horses
Horses in the Olympics
1997 animal births
Mitt Romney